Karamo Jawara (born 25 June 1991) is a Gambian-Norwegian professional basketball player who last played for Bàsquet Girona.

Jawara played college basketball for North Carolina Central. As a senior, he averaged 7.6 points, 6.4 rebounds, and 2.3 assists per game, shooting 44.3 percent from the floor.

In the years 2015-2017, he played professionally in Romania and Greece.

In 2017, he became the Most Valuable Player of Spain's LEB Plata. Thereafter, he joined Cambados Xuven in the LEB Oro. During the 2018-19 season Jawara played for ETHA Engomis of the Cypriot league, averaging 10.4 points, 8.7 rebounds, 4.3 assists and 1.5 steals per game. He joined Gipuzkoa in 2019 and averaged 5.0 points and 3.4 rebounds per game. On October 8, 2020, Jawara signed with Iberojet Palma. He averaged 8.5 points, 5.5 rebounds and 2.4 assists per game. On July 14, 2021, Jawara signed with Bàsquet Girona.

He is a member of the Norwegian national basketball team.

References

External links
ESPN Profile
North Carolina Central Eagles bio
Profile at realgm.com

Videos
 Karamo Jawara Youtube.com video 

1991 births
Living people
Bàsquet Girona players
Forwards (basketball)
Halifax Hurricanes players
Machites Doxas Pefkon B.C. players
North Carolina Central Eagles men's basketball players
Norwegian expatriate basketball people in the United States
Norwegian men's basketball players
Norwegian people of Gambian descent
Sportspeople from Bergen